ESRI may refer to:

Economic and Social Research Institute (ESRI), an Irish economic research institute
Esri, a GIS software company (Environmental Systems Research Institute)